On the evening of 27 April 1993, a DHC-5 Buffalo transport aircraft of the Zambian Air Force crashed into the Atlantic Ocean shortly after taking off from Libreville, Gabon. The flight was carrying most of the Zambian national football team to a 1994 FIFA World Cup Qualifier against Senegal in Dakar. All 25 passengers and five crew members were killed. The official investigation concluded that the pilot had shut down the wrong engine following an engine fire. It also found that pilot fatigue and a faulty instrument had contributed to the accident.

Accident
The flight had been specially arranged by the Zambian Air Force for the football team. The journey was scheduled to make three refuelling stops; the first at Brazzaville, Congo, the second at Libreville, Gabon, and the third at Abidjan, Ivory Coast.

At the first stop in Brazzaville engine problems were noted. Despite this, the flight continued and a few minutes after taking off from the second stop in Libreville the left engine caught fire and failed. A Gabonese report released in 2003 attributed the pilot's actions to a faulty warning light and fatigue.

Aircraft
The aircraft entered service in 1975. The plane had been out of service for five months from late 1992 until 21 April 1993. Test flights were carried out on 22 and 26 April. Prior to the departure for Senegal, checks revealed a number of defects in the engine: carbon particles in oil filters, disconnected cables and trace of heating. However, the flight went ahead as scheduled.

Passengers
The Chipolopolo were a very promising Zambia national team. At the 1988 Olympic Games in Seoul they thrashed Italy 4–0, including a hat-trick from Kalusha Bwalya, who won the African Footballer of the Year later that year. They had their eyes on the 1994 Africa Cup of Nations trophy, having finished third in the 1990 edition, and a place at their first World Cup.

All 30 passengers and crew, including 18 players, as well as the national team coach and support staff, died in the accident. The Chipolopolo's captain, Kalusha Bwalya—later national team coach and president of the Football Association of Zambia (FAZ)—was not aboard the flight as he was in the Netherlands playing for PSV at that time and had made separate arrangements to make his own way to Senegal to take part in the match. Charles Musonda, at the time playing in Belgium for Anderlecht, was previously injured and thus was not on the flight. Johnson Bwalya also escaped the disaster, who at the time was playing for FC Bulle in Switzerland. Bennett Mulwanda Simfukwe, who had been seconded to the FAZ by his employers (ZCCM) for 5 years and was supposed to be on this flight, wasn't on it because his employers demanded that he should immediately be removed from the list of those who were officially scheduled to travel to Senegal.

Investigation
A campaign to have the Gabonese crash investigation publicly released continued into the 2000s. In November 2003 a preliminary crash investigation report was released by the Gabonese government, which claimed that the left engine had caught on fire, and in an attempt to control the fire the pilot thought he had shut down that engine, when in reality he shut down the right engine due to a faulty light. Despite this relatives of the victims continue to lobby the Zambian government to produce a report on how the aircraft was allowed to leave Zambia, and why the players were transported on a military plane.

In May 2002, $4 million was given to families of the deceased players in compensation.

Aftermath

The members of the national team killed in the crash were buried in what became known as "Heroes' Acre", just outside the Independence Stadium in Lusaka.

A new side was quickly assembled, and led by Kalusha Bwalya, faced up to the difficult task of having to complete Zambia's World Cup qualifiers (narrowly missing qualification by finishing one point behind Morocco) and then prepare for the upcoming African Nations Cup which was only months away to be hosted in Tunisia.

The resurrected team defied the odds, and displaying an attacking playing style, reached the 1994 African Cup of Nations final against Nigeria. They took the lead in the first half, but the Super Eagles quickly equalised and followed up with the winner in the second half. In spite of the loss, the Zambian side returned home as national heroes.

In 2012, Zambia won the Africa Cup of Nations in Libreville, only a few hundred metres inland from the crash site; the victory was dedicated to the ones who lost their lives in the tragedy. Zambia beat Côte d'Ivoire 8–7 in a penalty shoot out after the game ended 0–0 after normal and added time.

The accident was the subject of the 2015 Spanish/Zambian documentary film Eighteam, directed by Juan Rodriguez-Briso.

Victims
All thirty people on board died in the crash. 24 bodies were recovered, but only 13 could be identified.

Crew
 Colonel Fenton Mhone (pilot)
 Lt Colonel Victor Mubanga (pilot)
 Lt Colonel James Sachika (pilot)
 Major Edward Nambote (flight engineer)
Corporal Thomas Sakala

Coaching staff
 Godfrey "Ucar" Chitalu (coach)
 Alex Chola (assistant coach)

Footballers

See also
 List of accidents involving sports teams

References

External links

BBC – Famous Air Crash Victims – Part 3: Sportsmen

1993 in Gabon
1993 in Zambia
Aviation accidents and incidents involving professional sports teams
Zambia national football team air disaster
Aviation accidents and incidents in Gabon
Accidents and incidents involving the de Havilland Canada DHC-5 Buffalo
Accidents and incidents involving military aircraft
Airliner accidents and incidents caused by in-flight fires
Accidental deaths in Gabon
1994 FIFA World Cup qualification (CAF)
Zambia national football team
1993–94 in Zambian football
1993 in Zambian sport
April 1993 events in Africa
20th century in Libreville
1993 in Gabonese sport